Princess Diana (1961–1997) was the first wife of Prince Charles (later King Charles III).

Princess Diana may also refer to:

People 
 Princess Diana of Bourbon-Parma (1932–2020), French aristocrat
 Diana Álvares Pereira de Melo, 11th Duchess of Cadaval (born 1978), Portuguese noblewoman and author
 Diane von Fürstenberg (born 1946), Belgian fashion designer and ex-wife of Prince Egon von Fürstenberg
 Diane, Duchess of Württemberg (born 1940), German artist

Fictional characters 
 Wonder Woman, a DC Comics superheroine, also known as Princess Diana of Themyscira
 Diana Scott, a young celebrity model played by Julie Christie, who eventually marries an Italian prince and thereafter is referred to by the tabloids as "Princess Diana," in the 1965 British film Darling

See also
 
 Diana Spencer (disambiguation)
 Lady Di (disambiguation)